Phillip H. Emerson (c. 1834 – March 9, 1889) was a justice of the Supreme Court of the Utah Territory from 1873 to 1885.

Born in Virginia, Emerson attended the common schools until he was advanced enough to become a schoolteacher. He read law to gain admission to the bar, and entered private practice in Washington, Vermont, Just before the American Civil War, he moved to Battle Creek, Michigan, where he continued to practice. He was elected to the Michigan House of Representatives, and then the Michigan Senate, of which he was president pro tempore for a term.

In 1873, President Ulysses S. Grant appointed Emerson to the Territorial Supreme Court of Utah, after an endorsement from Michigan Senator Thomas W. Ferry. He was reappointed by President Rutherford B. Hayes in 1877, and by President Andrew Garfield in 1881, continuing until his retirement on April 1, 1885. Emerson then returned to private practice in Ogden, Utah. In 1883, he was appointed to a committee appointed to revise the laws of the territory.

Emerson died in his home following a period of heart problems.

References

1830s births
1889 deaths
People from Virginia
U.S. state supreme court judges admitted to the practice of law by reading law
Members of the Michigan House of Representatives
Michigan state senators
Justices of the Utah Supreme Court
19th-century American politicians
19th-century American judges